Landing On A Hundred is the sophomore studio album by R&B artist Cody Chesnutt. It was released in October 2012 under Vibration Vineyard and One Little Indian Records. The album was recorded at Royal Studios in Memphis, Tennessee and SuPow Studios in Cologne, Germany

Track list

References

2012 albums
Cody Chesnutt albums
One Little Independent Records albums